Kehilla Community Synagogue is a politically progressive synagogue in Oakland, California, founded in 1984 by "people who wanted a synagogue that would be a spiritual home for politically progressive people who felt no connection with traditional synagogues." It sees its "spiritual mandate to heal and repair the world by increasing social justice, eschewing war and all forms of violence and aggression, caring for the planet, and exhibiting loving kindness to all." It is open to people of all colors, genders, and sexual orientations.

References

Further reading
 Kehilla Community Synagogue: An Interview with Dr. Ron Glass Georgie Blewett. Jun 04, 2019. Leviathan Jewish Journal. Retrieved August 22, 2021.
 How Piedmont’s Kehilla synagogue adapted to survive pandemic Linda Davis. January 27, 2021.  East Bay Times. Retrieved August 22, 2021.
 Piedmont: Kehilla Community Synagogue to celebrate 30th anniversary  Maya Mirsky. December 10, 2014. The Mercury News. Retrieved August 22, 2021.

External links
 Kehilla Community Synagogue

Progressivism in the United States
Unafilliated synagogues in California
Synagogues in Oakland, California
Jewish organizations established in 1984
1984 establishments in California